Schwende-Rüte District is a district of the canton of Appenzell Innerrhoden in Switzerland.

History
Schwende-Rüte is formed in 1 May 2022 after the merger the districts of Rüte and Schwende.

Name
The name refers to the two former municipalities.

References

External links

Official website

Cultural property of national significance in Appenzell Innerrhoden
Districts of Appenzell Innerrhoden